Admiral Stirling may refer to:

Charles Stirling (1760–1833), British Royal Navy vice admiral
Frederick Stirling (1829–1885), British Royal Navy vice admiral
James Stirling (Royal Navy officer) (1791–1865), British Royal Navy admiral
Walter Stirling (1718–1786), British Royal Navy admiral
Yates Stirling (1843–1929), U.S. Navy rear admiral
Yates Stirling Jr. (1872–1948), U.S. Navy rear admiral